Mac Bethad (fl. 1127 x 1131) is the first recorded High Medieval Bishop of Ross, a See then located at Rosemarkie.

He makes his only historical appearance as Macbeth Rosmarkensis Episcopus (i.e. "Mac Bethad, Bishop of Rosemarkie") in a list of witnesses to a charter granted by King David I of Scotland to the Church of Dunfermline, confirming the previous rights of that church.

The charter is dated by its modern editor to 1128, but is more safely dated to the period between the years 1127 and 1131.

Notes

References
Dowden, John, The Bishops of Scotland, ed. J. Maitland Thomson, (Glasgow, 1912)
Lawrie, Sir Archibald, Early Scottish Charters Prior to A.D. 1153, (Glasgow, 1905)

External links
Dauvit Broun's list of 12th century Scottish Bishops

11th-century births
12th-century deaths
Bishops of Ross (Scotland)
Medieval Gaels from Scotland
12th-century Scottish Roman Catholic bishops